Akbar Road is a main road, in central New Delhi, India. At the north-east end it stretches from the India Gate roundabout. At the south-west end it stretches up to the Teen Murti roundabout. The roundabout leads to Lok Kalyan Marg, Rajaji Marg, Teen Murti Marg and Safdarjung Road. It is also the road on which India's political party Indian National Congress have their head office.

Junctions
A junction is formed at roundabout connecting Mansingh Road and Maulana Azad Road.
 Another junction is formed at Motilal Nehru Place, where Motilal Nehru Road and Janpath Road intersect this road.
 Another junction is formed at a roundabout where Krishna Menon Road, Tughlaq Road and Tees January Marg meet.

This road along with its adjoining roads forms the exclusive V.V.I.P zone where India's topmost powerful politicians live which includes cabinet ministers, senior MPs and is yards away from the Parliament and the Presidential Palace.

Controversy 
In 2016 General Vijay Kumar Singh demanded that Akbar Road be renamed as Maharana Pratap Singh Road, erroneously claiming that the Indian-born Mughal Emperor was an "invader". In 2018, the signage was defaced and a banner proclaiming "Maharana Pratap Singh Road" was pasted over the signage. An FIR was registered by the police.

See also 

 List of things named after Akbar the Great

References

 

Roads in Delhi
Streets in New Delhi